Sotiris Vasiliou (born 29 December 1996) is a Cypriot footballer who plays for AEZ Zakakiou as a left back.

Career

AEZ Zakakiou
Ahead of the 2019-20 season, Vasiliou joined AEZ Zakakiou.

References

External links

1996 births
Living people
Cypriot footballers
AEL Limassol players
AEZ Zakakiou players
Association football defenders
Sportspeople from Limassol